Zachary Drake (born September 2, 1991) is a Canadian soccer player who plays for League1 Ontario club Electric City FC. He plays as a full-back or midfielder.

Early life
Born in Ottawa, Drake played youth soccer with Nepean City SC. In 2008, having impressed on an earlier trip, he went on an extended training months-long training stint with the U17 team of Brazilian club Nacional AC (SP). Afterwards, he joined the Ottawa Fury Academy.

In 2010, he received a scholarship to play at Holy Cross College. After that season, he had a brief training stint with Brazilian club Cruzeiro. In 2011, he transferred to Bethel College. In 2013, he was an NAIA Scholar-Athlete recipient.

Playing career
In 2010, he began playing with Ottawa Fury SC in the Premier Development League.

In 2014, he joined German club FCA Darmstadt.

In 2015, he joined German club Viktoria 07 Kelsterbach, making six league appearances and 11 total appearances.

In 2016, he joined Australian club Olympia FC Warriors in the NPL Tasmania. He scored his first goal on April 9 against Clarence United, which earned Goal of the Week, Team of the Week, and Player of the Week honours.

In June 2016, he joined another Australian club, Northcote City FC of the NPL Victoria.

Afterwards, he returned to Viktoria 07 Kelsterbach, playing in seven league games.

In 2017, he joined Portuguese club FC Maia.

In January 2018, he joined USL club Las Vegas Lights. He debuted in the season opener, before eventually leaving the club shortly after in June. 

In the latter part of 2018, he returned to Canada, signing with League1 Ontario club Vaughan Azzurri, scoring two goals in his debut against Ottawa South United. He appeared in four regular season matches, scoring three goals, and also appeared in four playoff matches, winning the League1 Ontario Championship.

In 2019, he joined Oakville Blue Devils FC, playing in 14 regular season matches and four playoff matches, winning the regular season title with the Blue Devils. He returned to the club in 2021 (the 2020 season was cancelled due to the COVID-19 pandemic), playing in two regular season matches and two playoff matches, helping them reach the championship final, where they were defeated, finishing as finalists.

Ahead of the 2022 season, he played in a pre-season friendly with Alliance United FC against York United FC. On March 31, 2022, he signed with Electric City FC.

References

External links 
 
 NPL Victoria profile
 NPL Tasmania profile

1991 births
Living people
Association football fullbacks
Canadian soccer players
Soccer players from Ottawa
Expatriate soccer players in Australia
Expatriate footballers in Germany
Expatriate footballers in Portugal
Expatriate soccer players in the United States
Canadian expatriates in Australia
Canadian expatriates in Germany
Canadian expatriates in Portugal
Canadian expatriates in the United States
Bethel College (Indiana) alumni
Northcote City FC players
F.C. Maia players
Las Vegas Lights FC players
USL Championship players
League1 Ontario players
Blue Devils FC players
Vaughan Azzurri players
Bethel Pilots
College men's soccer players in the United States
Electric City FC players
Ottawa Fury (2005–2013) players